Sundries (singular sundry) may refer to:

 Miscellaneous small items, usually of no large value and too numerous to mention separately, such as toiletries 
 Sundry (cricket)